The Ukraine national beach handball team is the national team of Ukraine. It is governed by the Ukrainian Handball Federation and takes part in international beach handball competitions.

World Championships results
2004 – 5th place
2012 – 2nd place
2016 – 6th place

External links
Official website
IHF profile

References 

Beach handball
National beach handball teams
Handball in Ukraine